Stranger in the City is a 1962 Turkish drama film directed by Halit Refiğ. It was entered into the 3rd Moscow International Film Festival.

Cast
 Göksel Arsoy as Aydin
 Nilüfer Aydan as Gönül
 Reha Yurdakul as Selami Agaçligil
 Ali Sen as Serafettin Toraman
 Talat Gözbak as Mustafa Bakirci (as Talât Gözbak)
 Erol Tas as Nazif Usta

References

External links
 

1962 films
1962 drama films
Turkish drama films
1960s Turkish-language films
Films directed by Halit Refiğ